Riza Angela Zalameda (born February 10, 1986) is an American-Filipino retired tennis player.

From 2004 to 2008, she attended and represented University of California on the Division I women's tennis team. She is a former NCAA national champion in the doubles and team events, and four-time All-American in singles and doubles.

Upon graduating with a degree in Anthropology, she played on the WTA Tour.
In 2012-2016 she served as the assistant coach for Columbia University's Division I women's tennis program in New York City. Then, from 2016 to 2018, she led the newly fully funded tennis program at Seton Hall University in South Orange, New Jersey.

Currently, she is the tennis coach at Necker Island in the British Virgin Islands.

Biography
Riza was born to Filipino parents Rolly and Angie Zalameda in Los Angeles. She started playing tennis at five and was coached by her father, Rolly.

Zalameda played mainly on tournaments of the ITF Women's Circuit where she won two singles and six doubles titles. Her career-high WTA rankings are No. 534 in singles (achieved in July 2006) and No. 76 in doubles (set in April 2010). She was runner-up at the doubles event of the Taipei Ladies Open in 2009 with Yayuk Basuki, her greatest success.

Zalameda also won seven medals at the Southeast Asian Games, representing the Philippines.

She retired from pro circuit 2011.

ITF Circuit finals

Singles (2–0)

Doubles (6–6)

External links
 
 
 http://www.uclabruins.com/sports/w-tennis/mtt/zalameda_riza00.html
 http://www.tennisgrandstand.com/archives/1489

Living people
1986 births
American sportspeople of Filipino descent
American female tennis players
Tennis players from Los Angeles
Southeast Asian Games gold medalists for the Philippines
Southeast Asian Games silver medalists for the Philippines
Southeast Asian Games bronze medalists for the Philippines
Southeast Asian Games medalists in tennis
Filipino female tennis players
UCLA Bruins women's tennis players
Competitors at the 2005 Southeast Asian Games
Competitors at the 2009 Southeast Asian Games